K. Sathu Selvaraj is an Indian politician and former Member of the Legislative Assembly. He was elected to the Tamil Nadu legislative assembly as an Anna Dravida Munnetra Kazhagam candidate from Srivaikuntam constituency in 1977 election.

References 

All India Anna Dravida Munnetra Kazhagam politicians
Living people
United Progressive Alliance candidates in the 2014 Indian general election
Year of birth missing (living people)
Tamil Nadu MLAs 1977–1980